What Price Hollywood? is a 1932 American pre-Code drama film directed by George Cukor and starring Constance Bennett with Lowell Sherman. The screenplay by Gene Fowler, Rowland Brown, Jane Murfin and Ben Markson is based on a story by Adela Rogers St. Johns and Louis Stevens. The supporting cast features Neil Hamilton, Gregory Ratoff, Brooks Benedict, Louise Beavers and Eddie "Rochester" Anderson.

Plot

Brown Derby waitress Mary Evans is an aspiring actress who meets film director Maximillan "Max" Carey in the restaurant. Max is very drunk but is charmed by Mary and he invites her to a premiere at Grauman's Chinese Theatre. Max, who has an active sense of humor, arrives to collect her in a jalopy rather than a limousine and then gives the car to the parking valet as a tip.

Max takes Mary home after the event, but the next morning he remembers nothing about the previous night. Mary reminds him that he had promised her a screen test and expresses concern about his excessive drinking and flippant attitude, but he tells her not to worry.

Mary's screen test is a miserable failure, but she begs for another chance. After extensive rehearsals, she shoots the scene again, and producer Julius Saxe is pleased with the result, signing her to a contract. Just as quickly as Mary achieves stardom, Max finds his career on the decline, and he avoids a romantic relationship with Mary so that she will not become involved in his downward spiral.

Mary meets polo player Lonny Borden, who loves her despite his jealousy of her career demands. Lonny convinces Mary to marry him although Julius and Max try to discourage her. Lonny becomes increasingly annoyed by Mary's devotion to her work and finally leaves her. After their divorce is finalized, Mary discovers that she is pregnant.

Mary wins an award for her acting, but her moment of glory is disrupted when she must post bail for Max after he is arrested for drunk driving. She takes him to her home, where he wallows in self-pity despite her encouragement. Later, alone in Mary's dressing room, he stares at himself in the mirror and compares his face to that in a photograph from long before. He finds a gun in a drawer and commits suicide with a bullet to the chest.

Mary becomes the center of gossip about Max's suicide. Hoping to heal her emotional wounds, she flees to Paris with her son and reunites with Lonny, who begs her to forgive him and give their marriage another chance.

Cast

 Constance Bennett as Mary Evans
 Lowell Sherman as Maximilian 'Max' Carey
 Neil Hamilton as Lonny Borden
 Gregory Ratoff as Julius Saxe
 Brooks Benedict as Muto, Diner Who Will Put Mary in Pictures
 Louise Beavers as Bonita, Mary's Maid
 Eddie "Rochester" Anderson as James, Max's Butler
 Torben Meyer as Nick, Headwaiter at Brown Derby

Production

The film's original title was The Truth About Hollywood. Adela Rogers St. Johns loosely based her plot on the experiences of actress Colleen Moore and her husband, alcoholic producer John McCormick (1893-1961), and the life and death of director Tom Forman, who committed suicide following a nervous breakdown.

Producer David O. Selznick wanted to cast Clara Bow as the female lead, but executives at RKO's New York offices were hesitant to invest in a Hollywood story because similar projects had been unsuccessful in the past. By the time that Selznick convinced them that the project had potential, Bow was committed to another film.

Constance Bennett considered What Price Hollywood? her greatest film.

Four years after the film was released, Selznick approached Cukor and asked him to direct A Star Is Born (1937) starring Janet Gaynor and Fredric March. The plot was so similar to that of What Price Hollywood? that Cukor declined. RKO executives considered filing a plagiarism suit against Selznick International Pictures because of the similarities in the story, but eventually opted against legal action. Cukor would later direct the 1954 musical version of A Star Is Born starring Judy Garland and James Mason.

Note that despite the film's interrogatory title, neither of the two contemporary posters shown here do end with that punctuation.

Reception
In a contemporary review, The New York Times wrote: "Parts of 'What Price Hollywood' are very amusing, intentionally, and others are despite themselves. Sections of it are very sorrowful, in the bewildered manner of a lost scenario writer, and yet others are quite agreeable. There is some good acting in the picture—much more, indeed, than it deserves."

Variety's July 1932 review proclaimed: "It's a fan magazine-ish interpretation of Hollywood plus a couple of twists invariably known as the working girls' delight. ... Cukor tells it interestingly. Not so much for show people, perhaps, but the peasantry will like it as amusement even if it fails to fully convince them, too. Story has its exaggerations, but they can sneak under the line as theatrical license."

The film was a runaway box-office hit. However, according to RKO records, the film lost $50,000.

Awards and honors
Adela Rogers St. Johns and Jane Murfin were nominated for the Academy Award for Best Story but lost to Frances Marion for The Champ.

References

External links
 
 
 
 
 

1932 films
1932 drama films
American drama films
American black-and-white films
1930s English-language films
Films scored by Max Steiner
Films about actors
Films about Hollywood, Los Angeles
Films based on works by Adela Rogers St. Johns
Films directed by George Cukor
Films produced by David O. Selznick
Films set in Los Angeles
Films set in Santa Barbara, California
RKO Pictures films
Films with screenplays by Jane Murfin
1930s American films